Alphataurus is an Italian progressive rock band from the Milan area. Under the original lineup Alphataurus released only one album, Alphataurus, dated 1973, at the peak of the European progressive rock wave. The album was generally well received
 and work on a second album started, but due to “a string of personal events” the band split up in 1973.
 The band is named after Aldebaran, the brightest star in the Taurus constellation.

Some tracks from a second album were finally released in 1992 on the record Dietro l'uragano. The first album had a second life with good sales later, and it is still selling today.

In the year 2009 Guido Wassermann and Pietro Pellegrini, two members of the original line up, decided it was the time to return to the scene, and reformed the band to record a new album, including both revised tunes from the second incomplete album as well as brand new tunes.

The original drummer Giorgio Santandrea also rejoined the band, and in November 2010 they officially had the reunion after over 30 years, playing at the Progvention 2010 in Milan.
A live album from the reunion concert titles “Live In Bloom” was released in March 2012, but before the end of 2011 Giorgio Santandrea left the band, being replaced on drums by Alessandro “Pacho” Rossi.
Their second studio album "AttosecondO" has been released in September 2012.
In 2013 Fabio Rigamonti, bass player on both "Live In Bloom" and "AttosecondO", left the band and his role is taken by Marco Albanese; at the end of 2013 Pacho leaves the band as well, being replaced by Diego Mariani.

1973 Line-up
Pietro Pellegrini - Keyboards
Guido Wassermann  - Guitars and vocals
Alfonso Oliva -  Bass
Giorgio Santandrea - Drums
Michele Bavaro- Vocals

Latest Line-up
Pietro Pellegrini - Keyboards and synth
Guido Wassermann  - Guitar and vocal
Andrea Guizzetti - Piano, keyboard and vocal
Giorgio Santandrea - Drums and percussion
Moreno Meroni - bass and vocal
Claudio Falcone - lead vocal and hand percussion

Discography

1973 - Alphataurus
1992 - Dietro l'uragano (compilation of unreleased demos / rehearsals)
2012 - Live In Bloom
2012 - AttosecondO
2014 - Prime Numbers (live DVD + rarities album)

See also
Italian progressive rock

References

External links
 Official site
 Italian prog website

Italian progressive rock groups
Musical groups from Milan